George John Karb (February 15, 1858 – May 15, 1937) was the 30th and 39th mayor of Columbus, Ohio and the 27th person to serve in that office.   He was first elected in 1890 and served Columbus for two consecutive terms.  After four years as mayor, he was elected as Sheriff of Franklin County.  He later resought election in the 1911 mayoral campaign and defeated incumbent Republican mayor George S. Marshall.  He served Columbus as mayor during World War I and the Spanish Influenza of 1918.  After three consecutive terms in office Karb was defeated in the 1919 mayoral election by James J. Thomas. Karb died on May 15, 1937.

Works
Columbus in the Spot Light-- Marshallism Dealt a Fearful Blow (1913)
Columbus, Ohio, Industrial, Commercial, Financial, Residential, Institutional: The City with a Future (1919)

References

Further reading

External links

George John Karb at Political Graveyard
George John Karb at Green Lawn Abbey
George J. Karb as a past potentate of Aladdin Shriners of Columbus in 1905
Kate M. Van Dine Image of mayor Karb's wife at Library of Congress

1858 births
1937 deaths
Columbus City Council members
Mayors of Columbus, Ohio
Ohio Democrats
Ohio sheriffs
Burials at Green Lawn Abbey